Mary Waters was a native of Dublin who was a prominent nurse in the United States forces during the American Revolutionary War.  She migrated to Philadelphia in 1766.  She worked closely with Benjamin Rush and in 1791 he wrote notes for a planned biography of her.  He praised her for her professionalism and her deference to doctors.

Sources
Catholic history article on Waters
Kerber, Linda K. Women of the Republic: Intellect and Ideology in Revolutionary America. Chapel Hill: University of North Carolina Press, 1980. p. 74.

References

18th-century births
Year of death unknown
People from Dublin (city) in health professions
American nurses
American women nurses
Female wartime nurses
Kingdom of Ireland emigrants to the Thirteen Colonies
People from Philadelphia
People of Pennsylvania in the American Revolution
Women in the American Revolution
People of colonial Pennsylvania